The Mbarara–Kikagati Road is in southwestern Uganda, connecting the city of Mbarara in Mbarara District and the town of Kikagati in Isingiro District, at the border between Uganda and Tanzania. The road continues into Tanzania as Highway B182.

Location 
The coordinates of the road near Gayaza in Mbarara District are 0°41'37.0"S, 30°41'36.0"E (Longitude:-0.693611; Latitude:30.693333).

Overview
The conversion was done by China Communications Construction Company between 2011 and 2014.

The road effectively connects the town of Mbarara to the town of Kikagati and to Murongo across the Kagera River in Tanzania. In addition to the straight road, there is a  loop around Isingiro and Mabona.

See also
 List of roads in Uganda

References

External links
 Tender for Tarmacking Mbarara Kikagati Road
 Uganda National Road Authority Homepage

External links
Residents hail President on road, want cheaper solar batteries

 

Roads in Uganda
Mbarara District
Isingiro District
Ankole sub-region
Western Region, Uganda